First National Bank, also known as the National Loan and Exchange Bank Addition, is a historic bank building located at Columbia, South Carolina. It was built about 1924, and is a two-story, stone faced Neoclassical style building consisting of a two-story central section with flanking one-story wings. The front façade features four monumental 3/4 detached Doric order columns.

It was added to the National Register of Historic Places in 1980.

References

Bank buildings on the National Register of Historic Places in South Carolina
Neoclassical architecture in South Carolina
Commercial buildings completed in 1924
Buildings and structures in Columbia, South Carolina
National Register of Historic Places in Columbia, South Carolina